Gennadios Xenodochof (born 30 May 1988) is a Georgian-born Greek professional footballer who plays as a goalkeeper.

Club career 
He started his career from the youth teams of OFI Crete. He was sent on loan to Cretan clubs Ergotelis and Olympiakos Chersonissos until 31 August 2012, when he signed for Thrasyvoulos Fylis. A year later he moved to Doxa Drama. On 24 August 2013 he joined Zakynthos where he had his most productive season to date, making 44 appearances. On 17 July 2015  he signed with AE Larissa FC .   

On 28 November 2015, he scored his first  career goal, equalising in injury time with a header to help his club escape with a 1-1 away draw against Panachaiki for the Football League, preserving the club's undefeated record for the 10th consecutive game.  

On 16 December 2017, it was announced that Xenodochof had signed a short-term deal with Motherwell until January 2018.

References

External links
 arenalarissa.gr
 Ionian TV interview (video)
 youtube interview (video)

1988 births
Living people
Georgian emigrants to Greece
Greek footballers
Greek expatriate footballers
Association football goalkeepers
OFI Crete F.C. players
Ergotelis F.C. players
Thrasyvoulos F.C. players
Doxa Drama F.C. players
A.P.S. Zakynthos players
Athlitiki Enosi Larissa F.C. players
Motherwell F.C. players
Irodotos FC players
Expatriate footballers in Scotland
Greek expatriates in Scotland
Soviet people of Greek descent
Footballers from Tbilisi